A freighter is a vehicle or person that transports cargo, supplies, or goods, and may refer to:

Cargo ship
A large motor vehicle used to transport goods, known as a truck in the US and a "lorry" in the UK
The combination of a tractor unit with a semi-trailer, sometimes called a "semi" or "semi-truck"
Cargo aircraft
Cargo spacecraft
 Bristol Freighter, an aircraft

See also
Heavy hauler
Common carrier